Wong Wing-Luen, Wayne (born March 21, 1981, in Hong Kong) is a former tennis player from Hong Kong. He also goes by the nickname "Wayne". As of February 14, 2005, Wong was #1158 in world in the ATP rankings, which is the highest in his career.  The right-hander stands 5 feet 7 inches and weighs 140 pounds.

Wong quickly emerged as one of Hong Kong's most highly touted junior players. Between 1995 and 1999, Wong was ranked No. 1 in the Hong Kong Boys' 18U age group each year since the age of 14. Highlights of his junior career include ascending to a number 137 junior world ranking.

Wong is a member of the Hong Kong, China Davis Cup team, he debuted for Hong Kong at age 15 years 332 days in a reverse singles dead rubber against Thailand in an Asia/Oceania Zone Group II First Round tie at Victoria Park in February 1997. He has compiled an 18–12 record in Davis Cup action since 1997.

At the 2006 Asian Games, Wayne won the first round singles match against Mongolia's Badrakh Munkhbaatar, also, he won the second round match against Pakistan's Aqeel Khan. He lost in the third round to eventual gold medalist Danai Udomchoke. In doubles, he and Yu Hiu Tung lost to former World No. 1s and eventual gold medalists Mahesh Bhupathi and Leander Paes. But his run into the men's singles third round is the best result of the Hong Kong tennis team in this event.

References

External links
 
 
 

1981 births
Living people
Hong Kong male tennis players
Tennis players at the 1998 Asian Games
Tennis players at the 2002 Asian Games
Tennis players at the 2006 Asian Games
Asian Games competitors for Hong Kong